Borobul is a rural locality (a selo) and the administrative center, and one of two inhabited localities including Dakky of Zhokhsogonsky Rural Okrug in Tattinsky District of the Sakha Republic, Russia, located  from Ytyk-Kyuyol, the administrative center of the district. Its population as of the 2002 Census was 949.

Geography
The village is located in a flat area by river Tatta.

References

Notes

Sources
Official website of the Sakha Republic. Registry of the Administrative-Territorial Divisions of the Sakha Republic. Tattinsky District. 

Rural localities in Tattinsky District